Never Recover may refer to:

Songs
 "Never Recover", 1996 song by The Cardigans from their 1996 album First Band on the Moon
 "Never Recover", 2002 song by Dave Pirner from his 2002 album Faces & Names
 "Never Recover", 2018 song by Lil Baby and Gunna from their 2018 album Drip Harder

See also
 Recovery (disambiguation)